The men's 200 metres event at the 1968 Summer Olympics was held in Mexico City, Mexico. The final was won by Tommie Smith in a time of 19.83, a new world record. However, the race is perhaps best known for what happened during the medal ceremony – the Black Power salute of Smith and bronze medallist John Carlos. The background, consequences, and legacy of the salute carried forward into subsequent Olympics and is perhaps the single most memorable event from these Olympics.

The event started on 15 October and finished on 16 October. There were 50 athletes from 37 nations competing. The maximum number of athletes per nation had been set at 3 since the 1930 Olympic Congress. Smith's win was the second consecutive and 12th overall for the United States. Peter Norman's medal was the second for Australia in the men's 200 metres, after Stan Rowley's bronze 68 years earlier.

Background

This was the 15th appearance of the event, which was not held at the first Olympics in 1896 but has been on the program ever since. Three of the eight finalists from the 1964 Games returned: bronze medalist Edwin Roberts of Trinidad and Tobago, fourth-place finisher Harry Jerome of Canada, and fifth-place finisher (and 1960 gold medalist) Livio Berruti of Italy.

Tommie Smith was the 1967 and 1968 AAU champion; John Carlos was the 1967 Pan American Games and 1968 U.S. Olympic trials winners (with a time that would have been a world record, but was not ratified because his shoes had too many spikes). The two were heavily favored, though had considered boycotting the Olympics to protest racial discrimination in the United States.

Barbados, British Honduras (Belize), the Dominican Republic, El Salvador, West Germany, Honduras, Nicaragua, Sudan, Tanzania, and the Virgin Islands each made their debut in the event. The United States made its 15th appearance, the only nation to have competed at each edition of the 200 metres to date.

Competition format

The competition used the four round format introduced in 1920: heats, quarterfinals, semifinals, and a final. The "fastest loser" system introduced in 1960 was used again in the heats.

There were 7 heats of between 7 and 8 runners each, with the top 4 men in each advancing to the quarterfinals along with the next 4 fastest overall. The quarterfinals consisted of 4 heats of 8 athletes each; the 4 fastest men in each heat advanced to the semifinals. There were 2 semifinals, each with 8 runners. Again, the top 4 athletes advanced. The final had 8 runners. The races were run on a 400-metre track.

Records

Prior to the competition, the existing world and Olympic records were as follows.

Tommie Smith's 20.3 / 20.37 in the second heat matched the hand-timed Olympic record. Peter Norman broke that record with a 20.2 / 20.23 in the sixth heat. Smith's time in the third quarterfinal was 20.2 / 20.28, equaling the record. Mike Fray matched the old 20.3 second record in the fourth quarterfinal. In the first semifinal, Norman again ran a 20.2 (/ 20.22) but was behind John Carlos at 20.1 / 20.12 for another new Olympic record. Smith matched Carlos's hand-timing in the second semifinal, with 20.1 / 20.14. Smith then broke the 20-second barrier in the final, recording 19.8 hand-timed and 19.83 auto-timed for a new world record.

Schedule

All times are Central Standard Time (UTC-6)

Results

Heats

Heat 1

Heat 2

Heat 3

Heat 4

Heat 5

Heat 6

Heat 7

Quarterfinals

Quarterfinal 1

Quarterfinal 2

Quarterfinal 3

Quarterfinal 4

Semifinals

Semifinal 1

Semifinal 2

Final

References

Men's 200 metres
1968
Men's events at the 1968 Summer Olympics